Patrice Lhotellier (born 8 August 1966) is a French fencer. He won a gold medal in the team foil event at the 2000 Summer Olympics in Sydney, Athens, together with Jean-Noël Ferrari, Brice Guyart and Lionel Plumenail.

References

1966 births
Living people
People from Romilly-sur-Seine
Sportspeople from Aube
French male foil fencers
Olympic fencers of France
Olympic gold medalists for France
Olympic medalists in fencing
Fencers at the 1988 Summer Olympics
Fencers at the 1992 Summer Olympics
Fencers at the 2000 Summer Olympics
Medalists at the 2000 Summer Olympics
20th-century French people
21st-century French people